The 2022 Australian Athletics Championships was the 99th edition of the national championship in outdoor track and field for athletes in Australia. It was held between 26 March and 3 April at the Sydney Olympic Park Athletic Centre in Sydney.

Results

Men

Women

References 

Australian Athletics Championships
2022 in athletics (track and field)
March 2022 sports events in Australia
April 2022 sports events in Australia
Sports competitions in Sydney